Fabio Colonna (died 1554) was a Roman Catholic prelate who served as Patriarch of Constantinople (1550–1554) and Bishop of Aversa (1532–1554).

Biography
In 1532, Fabio Colonna was appointed by Pope Clement VII as Bishop of Aversa. On 19 Mar 1550, he was appointed by Pope Julius III as Patriarch of Constantinople. He served as Bishop of Aversa and Patriarch of Constantinople until his death in 1554. While bishop, he served as the principal co-consecrator of Durante Duranti, Bishop of Alghero.

See also
 Catholic Church in Italy

References

External links and additional sources
 (for Chronology of Bishops) 
 (for Chronology of Bishops)  
 (for Chronology of Bishops) 
 (for Chronology of Bishops) 

16th-century Italian Roman Catholic bishops
Bishops appointed by Pope Clement VII
Bishops appointed by Pope Julius III
Bishops of Aversa
1554 deaths